Rajesh Exports Limited is an Indian multinational gold retailer headquartered in Bangalore, Karnataka. The company refines, designs, and sells gold and jewelry. It was ranked 7th on the Fortune India 500 list in 2022, with revenues of ₹2.90 trillion, and 462nd in the Fortune Global 500. The present managing director is Prashant Mehta and the executive chairman is Rajesh Mehta.

History 
The company was founded in 1989 as Rajesh Exports Limited by Rajesh Mehta and his brother Prashant Mehta both born in a middle class Jain family. The brothers started manufacturing in a ten-person shop located in their garage in Bangalore.

By 1990, the company opened a retail front and rapidly expanded.

In 2001, the company built a large manufacturing facility in Bangalore.

In 2011, the company raised $134.9 million by converting the Foreign currency convertible bonds they had issued in 2007.

In 2015, the company acquired the largest gold refiner in the world, Valcambi of Balerna, Switzerland, for $400 million. Now they are planning to expand their Shubh Jewellers retail store.

See also

 List of companies of India
 List of largest companies by revenue
 List of corporations by market capitalization
 Make in India
 Forbes Global 2000
 Fortune India 500

References

Companies established in 1989
Manufacturing companies based in Bangalore
Jewellery companies of India
1989 establishments in Karnataka
Companies listed on the National Stock Exchange of India
Companies listed on the Bombay Stock Exchange